Asli Sungu (born 1975 Istanbul) is a German performance artist, and painter.

She lives and works in Berlin.

Awards
2010 The Delfina Foundation London residency
2007 Villa Romana prize
2007 blauorange award, shortlist

Works
"Ganz die Mutter" (2006), Video, 12 min.
"Ganz der Vater" (2006), Video, 14 min.

Exhibitions
2008 Deutsche Guggenheim, Berlin
2008 The Khyber, Halifax
2008 Goethe-Institut, Montreal
2006 Goethe-Institut, Ankara

References

External links
 
 
 
An Interview with Aslı Sungu by Angelika Stepken

1975 births
German people of Turkish descent
Artists from Berlin
Living people